Autosan Sancity 10LF a single-decker bus built by Autosan S.A. in the European Union.

Production of Sancity 10LF started in 2012 and till January 2013 buses were sold to Poland and Italy. Autosan Sancity 10LF is 100% low floor citybus. It has 3 doors (2-2-2) and incorporates an EEV standard engine, although it is a midibus due to its length.

Low-floor buses
Midibuses
Buses of Poland